Hollywood Squares (originally The Hollywood Squares) is an American game show in which two contestants compete in a game of tic-tac-toe to win cash and prizes. The show piloted on NBC in 1965 and the regular series debuted in 1966 on the same network. The board for the game is a 3 × 3 vertical stack of open-faced cubes, each occupied by a celebrity seated at a desk and facing the contestants. The stars are asked questions by the host and the contestants judge the truth of their answers to gain squares in the right pattern to win the game.

Though Hollywood Squares was a legitimate game show, the game largely acted as the background for the show's comedy in the form of joke answers (commonly called "zingers" by the production staff), often given by the stars prior to their real answer. The show's writers usually supplied the jokes. In addition, the stars were given the questions' subjects and bluff (plausible, but incorrect) answers prior to the show. The show was scripted in this sense, but the gameplay was not. In any case, as original host Peter Marshall explained at the beginning of the Secret Square game, the celebrities were briefed prior to the show to help them with bluff answers, but they heard the actual questions for the first time as they were asked on air.

Marshall hosted the original version of Hollywood Squares that aired on NBC from 1966 to 1980, as well as a nighttime syndicated version that ran from 1971 to 1981. It then returned to NBC in 1983 as part of a 60-minute hybrid series with Match Game, featuring Jon Bauman hosting the Hollywood Squares portion of that show. Following Marshall's retirement, the show has since been revived twice in syndication: a version hosted by John Davidson from 1986 to 1989, and another hosted by Tom Bergeron from 1998 to 2004.

In 2013, TV Guide ranked it at No. 7 in its list of the 60 greatest game shows ever. Internationally, there have been multiple versions produced under a variety of names (see International versions below).

Basic rules
Though there have been variations over the years in the rules of and the prizes in the game, certain aspects of the game have remained fairly consistent. Two contestants competed in every match, one playing X and the other O. With rare exceptions, the matches were male vs. female with the male playing the X position and referred to informally as Mr. X, with the female playing the O position and referred to informally as Ms. Circle. One of the contestants was usually a returning champion.

Taking turns, each contestant selected a square. The star in that square was asked a question and gave an answer, which was usually preceded by a zinger. The contestants had the choice of agreeing with the star's answer or disagreeing if they thought the star was bluffing. On rare occasions, a star did not know the correct answer to a question and was unable to come up with a plausible bluff. In such instances, the contestant was offered the chance to answer the question and earned or lost the square based on how they answered. Usually the contestants declined, in which case they incurred no penalty, and the same star was asked another question for that contestant to agree or disagree.

The objective was to complete a line across, vertically, or diagonally or to score as many squares as possible, as contestants could also win by capturing five squares (early in the Marshall run, a player was required to get enough squares to make it mathematically impossible for the opponent to get three in a row; it is possible to capture as many as six squares without blocking the opponent from getting a diagonal three in a row, which did occur in an early episode). Correctly agreeing or disagreeing with a star's answer captured the square. If the contestant failed to agree or disagree correctly, the square went to his/her opponent, unless the square resulted in the opponent winning by default, which was not allowed; in that case, the square remained unclaimed and the opponent got a chance to earn it themselves.

1966–1981

Bert Parks hosted the 1965 pilot of Hollywood Squares, which was taped at CBS Television City. A second pilot was taped with comedian Sandy Baron as host. Neither Parks nor Baron were considered to host the series, partly because NBC was “looking for a complete non-entity”, and partly because Baron was considered “too New Yorky”. NBC acquired the rights to the show, which debuted on October 17, 1966, with Peter Marshall as host, a job he held for 15 years. Marshall agreed to host because he did not want rival Dan Rowan to host. Hollywood Squares was the final addition to a short-lived game show powerhouse block on NBC, which for the next two years also included Concentration, Jeopardy!, You Don't Say!, Let's Make a Deal, Match Game and others. During most of its daytime run, NBC broadcast The Hollywood Squares at 11:30 a.m. Eastern/10:30 a.m. Central; it dominated the ratings until 1976, when it made the first of several time slot moves. The daytime show aired its 3,536th and last episode on June 20, 1980.

The show also ran at night, first on NBC from January 12 to September 13, 1968, as a mid-season replacement for the short-lived sitcom Accidental Family. A nighttime syndicated program ran from November 1, 1971, until May 22, 1981. Initially airing once weekly, the syndicated Squares added a second airing in 1972 and began airing daily or nightly in September 1980, the show's final season. 

The daytime series was played as a best two-out-of-three match between a returning champion and an opponent, with each individual game worth $200/$400 per match (originally $100 for each game and an additional $300 for the match that totaled $500). Originally, a five-match champion retired with an additional $2,500, the Secret Square prize package (if not yet won) and a new car; the cash bonus was increased through the years. By 1976, the prize for a five-day champion included additional cash ($5,000 or $10,000), two new cars and a luxury vacation, with a total value of somewhere between $20,000 and $25,000. In September 1976, an endgame was added after each match with the champion simply selecting a star, each of whom held an envelope with a prize; the top prize was $5,000, with additional prizes ranging from small kitchen appliances to items worth up to about $2,000.

The nighttime versions featured the same two contestants playing for the entire half-hour with each completed game worth $300 (NBC prime time) or $250 (syndicated). On the syndicated version, if time ran out with a game still in progress (interrupted by a loud horn that the host called "the tacky buzzer"), each X or O on the board at that point was worth an additional $50 to the contestants, with each contestant guaranteed at least $100 in total winnings. The contestant with the most money at the end of the show won a bonus prize, which for the first seven years of the syndicated series was a car. From 1978 to 1980, the endgame described above was used with each prize worth at least $5,000 including a new car; cash prizes of $5,000 and $10,000 were also available. If the match ended in a tie, one final question was played with the star of one contestant's choosing; if the contestant agreed or disagreed correctly, he/she won the match; otherwise, the match went to the opponent. The nighttime syndicated version's episodes were self-contained, unlike the daytime version where games could straddle.

For the final (1980–1981) season, the syndicated series left NBC's Burbank, California studio and moved to the Riviera Hotel and Casino in Las Vegas, Nevada. During the final season, games were no longer scored. Instead, the winner of each game won a prize, and if time ran out before a game could be completed, the prize went to the player with the most squares on the board. Additionally, the season's eight highest-winning contestants were invited back to play in a Grand Championship tournament at the end of the season. The final $100,000 Grand Championship Tournament was played in 1980 and won by Eric Lloyd Scott of Denver, Colorado. Prizes that year included a Geodesic Dome Home from Domes America, a Botany 500 wardrobe, a 50-day cruise on Delta Line Cruises, the first Apple II computer system, the original Sony Betamax, a camper trailer, a motorhome and $20,000 in cash.

Cast of stars

Many celebrities became recognized as regulars on the show. Some regulars were frequently asked questions pertaining to a certain topic or category. For instance, Cliff Arquette (in character as "Charley Weaver"), a history buff, excelled at American history questions; Rich Little almost always received questions about other celebrities, which gave him an opportunity to do an impression of that individual; Wally Cox was also given a lot of celebrity questions for which he usually gave the wrong answer; Roddy McDowall usually gave correct answers about the plays of Shakespeare; Rose Marie often received questions on dating and relationships, playing off her lovelorn comic persona; and Demond Wilson often responded with mock anger to questions that were carefully worded to play upon African-American stereotypes.

Other regulars and semi-regulars over the years included Nanette Fabray, Kaye Ballard, Morey Amsterdam, Florence Henderson, Buddy Hackett, Marty Allen, Wayland Flowers and Madame, Barbara Eden, George Gobel, Vincent Price, Weird Al Yankovic, Charo, Sandy Duncan, Carol Wayne, Jonathan Winters, Foster Brooks, The Lennon Sisters, Garrett Morris, Karen Valentine, John Davidson and Joan Rivers.

Paul Lynde was featured in the tactically important center square throughout most of the show's original run. In 1968, after two years on the show, Lynde became the regular center square. Lynde's outrageous jokes earned him three daytime Emmy Award nominations in 1972, 1973 and 1974. He left the series after taping the August 20–24, 1979, week of shows and was replaced by Wayland Flowers; Lynde returned when the series relocated to Las Vegas for the 1980–1981 season.

Secret Square
The Secret Square game is played as the first game on a given broadcast (or the first complete game, if a show began with a game already in progress) during the daytime series. In this game, a randomly selected Secret Square is shown only to the home audience by the shot of the television camera. A contestant who picked that square during the game won a bonus prize package if they correctly agreed or disagreed with the star. Secret Square prize packages added cash on the daytime edition, which started at around $1,000 for the 1966 episodes; the base amount increased in the later years from 1967 to 1980, by which time a new Secret Square package was worth around $3,500 to $4,500. The package grew daily until won. The question for the star was sealed in a special envelope and was almost always multiple choice.

For the 1968 NBC primetime series, the first two games are the Secret Square games. One Secret Square offered a trip and the other Secret Square offered a car or occasionally a boat. If not won, the prize offered in the first round carried over to the second round, with a second prize added. If not won in the second round, the Secret Square prize package went unclaimed.

During the first two seasons of the syndicated series (1971–1973), the first two games were Secret Square games, with the prize packages generally worth about $2,500. If no one claimed the prizes offered in the first round, they were carried over to the second round, and if still not won went unclaimed. Beginning in 1973 and ending in 1978, the first three games had a Secret Square, with each game offering different prize packages, usually worth between $2,000 and $7,000. From 1978 to 1980, the Secret Square games were cut to game numbers two and three (the first two games early on). The Secret Square was not used during the 1980–1981 daily syndicated version.

Storybook Squares (1969 & 1976–1977)

Hosted by Peter Marshall and announced by Kenny Williams, Storybook Squares, a children's version of Hollywood Squares, aired briefly on Saturday mornings on NBC from January 4 to August 30, 1969, and featured stars dressed as various fictional characters from television and fairy tales as well as historical figures from the past. NBC later brought the concept back to the daytime series in the 1976–1977 season with a slight retooling, where instead of children playing entire families played.

In an interview with E!'s True Hollywood Story on March 30, 2003 (episode 7.21), Marshall lauded the concept, but lamented that by the time each of the characters was introduced, very little of the show's half-hour format was left for actual gameplay.

The Match Game-Hollywood Squares Hour (1983–1984)

In 1983, several years after Orion Pictures acquired Hollywood Squares rights owner Filmways, NBC decided to attempt a revival of the series. What resulted was an effort produced by Mark Goodson Productions that combined the Hollywood Squares program, under license from Orion, with a revival of the Goodson-produced Match Game. The 60-minute program was dubbed The Match Game-Hollywood Squares Hour and debuted on October 31, 1983, at 3 p.m. Eastern, replacing the Peter Marshall-hosted series Fantasy. Jon Bauman (appearing as himself without his "Bowzer" persona from Sha Na Na) hosted the Hollywood Squares portion of the show. The only regular panelist on this version was Gene Rayburn, who reprised his role as host of Match Game; he always occupied the lower left square during Hollywood Squares, which Bauman also occupied during Match Game segments. Most of the semi-regulars were previously better known for Match Game (only on two weeks of episodes did a regular from the previous Hollywood Squares, George Gobel, appear on the panel). The announcer for this version was Gene Wood but was also sub-announced by either Rich Jefferies or Johnny Olson.

Hollywood Squares was always played as the second (middle) segment of the show, and featured the winner of the Match Game match played in the first half of the program facing off with the show's returning champion. This version of Hollywood Squares saw several different variations on the gameplay. First, the panelists were not given bluff answers or briefed. Second, the questions followed either a multiple-choice or true/false format. Third, for each square a contestant claimed $25 was added to his/her score with each game win starting at $100 for the first and increasing by that amount for subsequent games until time ran out and a winner was declared. In contrast to the original version of the show, players could win games by default if the opposing player incorrectly agreed/disagreed with a celebrity whose square gave the other player a completed row or five-square win. On all other versions of Squares, the player had to earn the winning celebrity's square on their own. The winner played the Super Match from Match Game for a cash prize.

The Match Game segment featured six panelists, as it had from 1973 to 1982; for the Hollywood Squares portion, a third tier was added to the panel seating area, with three more celebrities being introduced to the proceedings at the show's midpoint. All nine celebrities could play the Super Match.

The Match Game-Hollywood Squares Hour was not a success and NBC announced its cancellation in the spring of 1984, with the final episode airing on July 27, 1984. It was replaced the following Monday with the soap opera Santa Barbara, which ran for nine years.

1986–1989

Two years after the cancellation of The Match Game-Hollywood Squares Hour, a new Hollywood Squares series was put into production. Referred to throughout its run as The New Hollywood Squares, the program debuted on September 15, 1986, and was produced by Century Towers Productions with Rick Rosner serving as executive producer, Ernie De Massa as producer, Paul Ruffino as Location Manager for remote productions, and Orion Television as distributor (Century Towers was a subdivision of Orion formed to produce game shows, specifically this series and the 1987–88 syndicated revival of High Rollers; the name was in reference to the street that Orion was headquartered at the time).

John Davidson, who was a semi-regular panelist on the original Hollywood Squares, hosted the series. Shadoe Stevens was the announcer for the series and, beginning late in the first season, he also became a regular panelist occupying the bottom center square.  Starting with episode #100, Stevens temporary left the show to film the movie Traxx, and his brother Richard took over as announcer; Stevens returned for the final two weeks of the first season and remained until the series' end. After one season of rotating center squares, former Hollywood Squares panelist Joan Rivers joined the series as the permanent center square. Comic actor Jim J. Bullock also became the series' third regular panelist, usually in the upper-left square. All three took turns as guest hosts for Davidson; Howard Stern replaced Stevens as announcer/panelist during his week as host. All music for the program was composed by Stormy Sacks.

The game used the original version's rule that games could not be won due to an opponent's error. For the first season, each game was worth $500 with a bonus of $100 per square if time ran out in the middle of a game. Beginning in season two, the third and subsequent games were worth $1,000 (or $200 per square). If time had run out with the contestants tied, one more question was asked to one celebrity; if the contestant agreed or disagreed correctly, they won the money for one square and the match. If not, their opponent automatically won. The single-question format was also used on occasions where there was not enough time remaining for a proper third round. The contestant who finished with the most money won the match and went on to the bonus round. Contestants wore name tags on all episodes of this version except for the premiere.

This version lasted three seasons, ending on June 16, 1989. At the end of the final episode, a video clip from the first week of shows was run, introducing the celebrities who had appeared that week. Davidson, the panelists, the audience, and the crew then sang "Happy Trails" under the credits, with the crew members sitting in the squares and holding up signs that displayed their names and titles. The song continued under a montage of audio clips from the show's run as everyone faded away and the lights gradually went out, leaving only the squares illuminated, and the credits sequence ended on a freeze frame of balloons being showered onto the stage.

Secret Square
The second game of each show was a Secret Square game. As with the original version, the Secret Square was revealed to the home audience at the start of this game; if a contestant chose that square, a school bell sounded and if the contestant agreed or disagreed correctly, he/she won a prize (usually a trip). The prize did not increase in value from one show to the next if it was not collected.

Bonus round
The first two seasons of this version of the series employed a bonus round that was similar to the one used on the 1970s game show Split Second. Five cars, each of the same brand/make, were displayed on the stage for the entire week. The champion chose one of five keys and then chose the car they thought the key would start. The contestant also chose at least one celebrity to stand beside the car or sit in it with them for good luck; at times the entire panel congregated near the car, especially on Friday shows or when a champion reached a fifth win and automatically retired with the car.

If the chosen key started the car, the contestant won it and retired; otherwise, the contestant returned the next day with that car eliminated should he or she return to the bonus game. After a fifth victory, the contestant automatically won the only car still in play at that point and retired. Every broadcast week started with a new set of five cars; if a champion's reign carried over from the preceding week, one car was eliminated for each of his/her victories to that point, in ascending order of price.

For the final season, the champion first chose a car, then one of the nine celebrities. Each held a key; five of them had the correct keys, while the other four had keys that would not start any car. If the champion failed to win the chosen car, it remained available after subsequent victories instead of being eliminated. The five-day limit was removed, allowing champions to remain on this show until they either won a car or were defeated.

1998–2004

In 1991, King World Productions acquired the rights to the entire worldwide Hollywood Squares format from Orion Pictures Corporation as that company was going through its bankruptcy phase. King World only acquired format rights and owns copyrights for episodes produced since 1998; Orion retained copyrights to pre-1991 episodes. Six years later, King World decided to bring the series back to television and a revival was put in the works. Whoopi Goldberg was brought in to be the executive producer, and John Moffitt and Pat Tourk Lee were hired as producers. Goldberg's One Ho Productions and Moffitt-Lee Productions joined Columbia TriStar Television as co-production companies with King World, who handled distribution by themselves. This differed from the other two King World/Columbia TriStar collaborations on television at the time, Jeopardy! and Wheel of Fortune, as King World had no role in the production of those two series.

On September 14, 1998, the revival debuted with Tom Bergeron as its host; former Nickelodeon host Marc Summers was also considered. In addition to her production duties, Whoopi Goldberg served as the permanent center square, with series head writer Bruce Vilanch, Gilbert Gottfried, Martin Mull and Caroline Rhea as regular panelists and Brad Garrett, Bobcat Goldthwait, Jeffrey Tambor, George Wallace, Kathy Griffin and various others as semi-regular panelists. Shadoe Stevens returned as announcer but unlike the previous series, he was not a panelist on this version.

Following the 2001–2002 season, Goldberg left the series and Moffitt and Lee were fired. Vilanch also left his writing position and Rhea moved to New York to host The Caroline Rhea Show, a daytime variety series launched to replace The Rosie O'Donnell Show; O'Donnell had decided to leave her namesake show before the end of the 2001–02 season and Rhea, who was chosen by O'Donnell to be her replacement, served as guest host for most of the last season. Stevens also left his role as announcer.

The 2002–2003 season launched with Henry Winkler and his production partner Michael Levitt as the new executive producers and Jeffrey Tambor as the announcer (in addition to retaining his semi-regular appearance). Winkler guest announced for several weeks during the season. Some changes were made to the overall production with the show adopting a new logo that referred to the show as "H2". The set was given a makeover where the contestant desks were replaced with podiums with LED screens inside and a rewritten version of the Teena Marie song "Square Biz" became the theme song.

After Goldberg's departure, at first the show did not feature a traditional permanent center square. Instead, a new celebrity was in the center square each week. Ellen DeGeneres, Alec Baldwin and Simon Cowell were among those who played center square as was Peter Marshall, who appeared during a special theme week in 2002. Martin Mull was eventually chosen as the permanent center square for the 2003-04 season (though some guests continued to appear as centre square during a few occasional weeks of the season).

For most of the first five seasons of this Hollywood Squares series, the first and second games were worth $1,000 to the winner. The third game was worth $2,000, and every subsequent game until time ran out was worth $4,000. If a contestant did not win anything in the main game, $500 was given to them as a consolation prize. In the early episodes of the first season, contestants only played for half the money; $500 was won for each of the first two games, with $1,000 for the third and $2,000 for all subsequent games and $250 was given as a consolation prize for failing to win a game. The consolation prize amount also was used for each contestant's square in the event that time ran out during a game, and was counted towards their cash total to determine the day's champion.

The tiebreaker was the same as the previous versions except that the contestant who has won the most games, most squares overall or won the last game played (whichever came first) had the option to play the question or pass it to his/her opponent, with a miss by either contestant giving their opponent the win by default.

For the first season of this Hollywood Squares series, two new contestants competed on each episode. A coin toss determined who would begin the first game during this time. Beginning in the second season, the returning champion rule was reinstated; a contestant could stay on for a maximum of five days. With this change, the incoming challenger began the first game of a match.

Secret Square
The first season also saw up to two Secret Square games. In the earliest episodes of the series, two Secret Square games were played on each show with a different prize offered for each game. The Secret Square was played in both the second and third games of the day, but after two weeks the Secret Square prize only carried over to the third game if neither contestant had claimed in it the second game. From the second season forward, the Secret Square was only played in the second game.

Beginning in the second season and continuing until the end of the fifth season, the Secret Square game was played for an accumulating jackpot of prizes that Bergeron referred to as the "Secret Square stash". A new prize was added to the jackpot each day until someone claimed it.

Bonus round
The Bergeron Hollywood Squares employed three different bonus games during its six seasons on air.

First version
Originally, the show used the same "pick a star, win a prize" format the Marshall version had used during its last few years on the air. Each of the nine squares hid a different prize, with $10,000 cash ($15,000 in season 3) and a car being the two most expensive. The day's winner simply picked the celebrity they wanted, and won whatever prize was in an envelope that star was holding. As noted by Bergeron at the start of the bonus round each episode, the prizes totaled over $100,000.

Beginning partway through the first season and continuing until partway through season four, the champion could only win the prize by correctly agreeing/disagreeing with the response that the chosen celebrity gave to a Secret Square-style question. A champion who failed to do was awarded a consolation prize of $2,500 cash in the first season; this award was dropped once returning champions were reinstated in the second season. However, during theme weeks in which contestants only played once, the $2,500 was given for a miss.

Big money round
Beginning approximately two months into season four and continuing until the end of that season in June 2002, Hollywood Squares instituted a new high-stakes round in response to the recent trend of quiz shows offering big cash prizes.

The champion faced a general knowledge trivia round with their choice of any of the nine celebrities. Again, each of the celebrities held envelopes with varying dollar amounts hidden inside, ranging from $1,000 to $5,000 (increments of $500). If the champion picked a square that contained more than one person, the champion selected only one person from that square. The champion was given 60 seconds to answer as many questions as possible and was allowed to consult their celebrity partner for help; however, only the champion's answers were accepted. Each correct answer was worth the amount in the envelope, which was revealed at the start of the round.

At the end of the 60 seconds, the champion was given a choice to either quit with the money earned in the round or attempt to go double-or-nothing on an open-ended final question, with the category given to the contestant before he/she made the decision to play on.

Keys
As part of the overhaul done for the fifth season of Hollywood Squares, a new bonus round was conceived. Taking a cue from the 1980s syndicated series, the round involved contestants using keys to try to win prizes.

To start the round, a 30-second speed round was played. One at a time, the champion chose a celebrity and Bergeron would read a statement about them. The champion had to either agree or disagree with the statement.

Once the 30 seconds were up, Bergeron and the champion moved from the contestant area to the stage floor where the day's prize awaited. For each correct answer the champion gave in the speed round, one key was blacked out on a grid of nine. After the speed round, the champion chose one from the remaining keys. If the key performed the desired action, the champion won the prize.

If the champion did not win the prize on a particular show, he/she received $1,000 (originally $500) for each correct answer given during the speed round as a consolation. For each subsequent attempt at winning the prize, one additional key was blacked out at the outset of the round.

Once the champion won a prize, a new prize would be available for him/her to try for if he/she returned to the bonus round the next day. The procedure for each new prize was the same.

For season five, the prize levels and the methods to win them were as follows:
 1st win: Car. To win, the selected key had to start its engine. 
 2nd: $25,000. To win, the selected key had to unlock a safe containing the money. 
 3rd: Trip around the world or a trip of a lifetime (worth between $20,000–$30,000). To win, the selected key had to open a steamer trunk. 
 4th: $50,000. To win, safe needed to be unlocked. 
 5th: $100,000 To win, safe needed to be unlocked.

On occasion, a gift certificate to an upscale merchant was placed inside the safe instead of the designated cash prize. This was usually done for special theme weeks or tournaments.

Also, for theme weeks, each match's winner would have one extra key removed at the start of the round since they would only play once.

Final season changes
For the sixth and last season of Hollywood Squares, more changes were made to the series. First, John Moschitta Jr. replaced Jeffrey Tambor as the announcer and Bruce Vilanch returned to the series as an occasional panelist. Second, the game format was scrapped in favor of a return to the two-out-of-three match format last seen on the NBC series in 1980. Each game was worth $1,000 and the first player to win the necessary two games won the match. The Secret Square was still played during the second game but the accumulating jackpot of prizes was discarded in favor of playing for one prize per match, regardless of whether or not the previous match's prize was won. Third, the change in format resulted in the show no longer being self-contained, as matches could and often did straddle episodes.

The bonus round format from the previous season remained, with the following prize structure.

 1st win: Trip (unlock steamer trunk)
 2nd: $10,000 (unlock safe)
 3rd: Luxury car (start engine)
 4th: $25,000 (unlock safe)
 5th: Trip around the world (unlock steamer trunk)

The rules, however, were different. All nine keys were in play every time a contestant played the bonus round regardless of whether he/she had won the prize in the previous round or not. Each correct answer in the first half of the round was only worth $500 if the prize was not won.

Theme weeks used the game format from the first five seasons, with each match played to time and the bonus round serving as the final segment. The winners of these matches played the bonus round for $10,000 cash or a car, and had one key eliminated at the outset before eliminating any additional keys.

Hip Hop Squares (2012 & 2017-2019)

Hip Hop Squares aired on MTV2 from May 22 until December 18, 2012, hosted by Peter Rosenberg while the announcer was DJ Ms. Nix (a.k.a. Nicole Lyn), then returned five years later on VH1 hosted by DeRay Davis (who was previously a panelist in the original MTV2 version) while the announcer was executive producer Ice Cube from May 13, 2017, until September 17, 2019. While the MTV2 version played much like the original, the VH1 version featured celebrities as contestants playing for a member of the studio audience.

The West Virginia Squares (2014)
From June 23–24, 2014 as part of an event called FestivAll; a one-off limited live stage version dubbed The West Virginia Squares streamed on local television station WVPB's official YouTube channel and on wvpublic.org in West Virginia only. Hosted by original Hollywood Squares host (and local native) Peter Marshall reprising his role while the announcer was Bob Brunner. The trivia questions were mainly focused on the music and history of its state, for only four episodes were taped at the Clay Center. The celebrities that were seen in this version were: Larry Groce, Landau Eugene Murphy Jr., Bil Lepp, Donnie Davidson, Charlie McCoy, Autumn Blair, Joyce DeWitt, Charisse Hailsop, Danny Jones, Steve Bishop, Billy Edd Wheeler and Michael Cerveris.  DeWitt was also a panelist on the original version and (like Marshall) was a West Virginia native. No bonus round was played.

Nashville Squares (2019)
A country music themed version called Nashville Squares hosted by Bob Saget aired on CMT from November 1 until November 29, 2019. Similarly to Hip Hop Squares (2017 version), celebrities played for a member of the studio audience.

Hollywood Museum Squares (2021)
In 2021, The Hollywood Museum announced a limited run revival of the series as a fundraiser for the organization. Dubbed Hollywood Museum Squares, each episode is introduced by Marshall and announced by Shadoe Stevens and Harvey (One Episode), with Davidson, Bergeron, Vilanch, Pat Finn and Marc Summers each hosting one of the episodes. The panelists for the game included  Loni Anderson, Alison Arngrim, Rico E. Anderson, Gilbert Gottfried, Rich Little, Glenn Scarpelli, Jerry Mathers, Donna Mills, Judy Tenuta and Lindsay Wagner, among others.
All participants appeared via videoconferencing over a 3D computer simulation of the 1986-89 set designed by Dustin James.

Writers included Louis Virtel from Jimmy Kimmel Live! and Jason Antoniewicz, a writer from Match Game, College Bowl and Tug of Words, to name a few.

The programs were directed by Steve Grant and Bob Loudin who directed many television programs including the Davidson Squares.

John Ricci, Jr. and Philip Berman served as the executive producers.

International versions
Color Key:
 Currently airing or returning  
 No longer airing  

The Indonesian version of the show aired at NET. in 2015 and was produced or licensed by FremantleMedia (now Fremantle).

Home versions and merchandise

Watkins-Strathmore produced the first two home versions of the show in 1967. Both versions featured a game board that allowed for writing in the celebrities' names  under each square (using crayon, soft lead pencil or a similar wipe-off medium). Each version included four decks of 45 question cards, one of which was marked with asterisks as the "Secret Square" question, which earned the player an extra $100 if answered correctly. Rules allowed for a 3-game match to be played, with $200 awarded for each game (just as the daytime rules specified).

Ideal issued a version of the game in 1974 with a picture of Peter Marshall on the box. Marshall was the original host of the television version throughout its entire first run. This was the first of the adaptations to feature humorous names for the celebrities.  A similar board game based on the UK version under the title Celebrity Squares was released by Buckingham Toys five years later in 1979 with a picture of host Bob Monkhouse on the cover. It did not specify a "Secret Square" rule. Matches were best two-out-of-three with no money awards specified.

Also in 1974, Event Records released a compilation album entitled Zingers from The Hollywood Squares (along with two companion books) on vinyl LP and cassette, containing the audio of what were considered to be some of the show's funniest moments. A CD of the album was included in Peter Marshall's 2002 book Backstage with the Original Hollywood Square.

Milton Bradley produced two home versions, first in 1980 with a game loosely based on the Marshall version, then in 1986 for the Davidson version, with a 3-D board and twelve "celebrities" to insert into the board. Both versions SPECIFIED that there was no "Secret Square" rule, and like the Ideal version, matches were best two-out-of-three with no money awards specified.

Parker Brothers released a similar 3-D board/12 celebrity inserts version in 1999, based on the Bergeron version. Early printings did not specify a "Secret Square" rule, but this was later revised so that every question card with a number ending in "5" was a "Secret Square" question worth $1,000 in bonus cash. Games were played until one player/team won $5,000. Alternate rules allowed for timed play (suggesting a 30-minute "as if you were on TV" game), with the player/team ahead once time expired being declared the winner.

GameTek released a version of Hollywood Squares in 1988 for DOS, Commodore 64 and Apple II computers and later for the NES based on the Davidson version. In 1999, Tiger Electronics released an electronic LCD handheld game based on the Bergeron version. In 2002, the official Hollywood Squares website had an online version of the show using the celebrities that were on that week. In 2010, Ludia released their version of Hollywood Squares for the PC, Wii, iPhone, iPad, iPod Touch and on PlayStation 3's PSN downloadable service from November 15, 2011; the games were based upon the 2002–2004 format and featured the voice of host Tom Bergeron and video clips of celebrities Brad Garrett, Kathy Griffin, Jeffrey Tambor and Martin Mull as the center square.

Episode status and reruns
Of the over 3,000 episodes of the original series, "no one has an exact count" of how many still exist. A substantial number, mostly from the daytime run, may have been destroyed in accordance with NBC policy of the era.

Game Show Network previously reran a package of 130 episodes from Marshall's hosting run, the majority of which came from the syndication run during the 1970s. At least 13 episodes from the 1968 NBC primetime run are also known to have been part of the Game Show Network rerun package. It was noted at the time that substantially more Marshall episodes than the 130 that GSN aired are believed to exist, but for a number of reasons (including political correctness concerns and personality rights clearance issues) have never been rerun. UCLA has a handful of NBC daytime episodes in their film and television archive.

The Match Game-Hollywood Squares Hour episodes exist in their entirety  and have been airing on the digital television network Buzzr, which is owned by Fremantle (the successor in interest to Mark Goodson Productions) since 2019.

The 1986–1989 syndicated series aired as part of USA Network's afternoon game show rerun package from September 11, 1989, to June 25, 1993. This version  has not been seen on television since USA stopped airing them.

The 1998 syndicated series has been rerun on Game Show Network in the past, and every season except one (including the final season) has been carried by the network over the years. Episodes were also rerun on GameTV in Canada.

References

External links
 
 
 
 
 
 
 

 
1966 American television series debuts
1981 American television series endings
1986 American television series debuts
1989 American television series endings
1998 American television series debuts
2004 American television series endings
Daytime Emmy Award for Outstanding Game Show winners
English-language television shows
First-run syndicated television programs in the United States
NBC original programming
Television franchises
Television series by CBS Studios
Television series by King World Productions
Television series by Heatter-Quigley Productions
Television series by MGM Television
Television series by Sony Pictures Television
American television series revived after cancellation
Television shows based on tic-tac-toe
Television series by Filmways